Veronica Maudlyn Ryan  (born 1956 in Plymouth, Montserrat) is a Montserrat-born British sculptor. She moved to London with her parents when she was an infant and now lives between New York and Bristol. In December 2022, Ryan won the Turner Prize for her 'really poetic' work.

Early life 
Born in 1956 in Plymouth, Montserrat, Ryan recalls her interest in art developing during her school years. In particular, she remembers making a Christmas tree in infant school and being inspired by the creative use of materials in a minimalistic way. She also cites her mother's patchwork as an inspiration for her art.

Ryan studied at Hertfordshire College of Art and Design (1974–75), Bath Academy of Art (1975–78), Slade School of Fine Art (1978–80), University College London, and the School for Oriental and African Studies (SOAS, 1981–83).

From the outset, Ryan was keen to break out of the mould of British modernism as it was then taught by drawing on a wider range of female sculptors and artists of colour. Among her earliest influences was the German-born American sculptor Eva Hesse, whose work she saw first-hand in 1979, when the exhibition Eva Hesse: Sculpture went on at the Whitechapel Gallery. Around the same time, Ryan discovered the work of Louise Bourgeois and Alice Aycock at the Hayward Gallery. Another formative influence was Barbara Hepworth. New Beacon Books was where Ryan went to find information about non-Western artists and artists of colour. In 1980 Ryan was awarded a Boise Travelling Scholarship from the Slade. This allowed her to visit Nigeria. There, she became especially interested in the re-adaptation of everyday consumables, including food and ephemeral waste materials, into fetishes used in spiritual offerings and shrines. The trip inspired her to continue her studies with an MPhil degree in art history at SOAS.

Ryan completed her studies at the beginning of the 1980s, a time marked by the rise of the British Black Arts Movement. She took part in the 1983 exhibition Black Women Time Now. Her participation in The Thin Black Line (ICA, London, 1985) and From Two Worlds (Whitechapel Gallery, London; Fruitmarket Gallery, Edinburgh, 1986) meant that she became associated with a broader anti-racist movement. Later, she felt the need to clarify that her work should not be pinned exclusively to race. "All along I have had various people be very critical of me because I did not fit into their politicized agenda," she said.

Sculpture 

Ryan's preferred materials range from heavy ones like cement, bronze, lead and painted plaster, to lighter and more ephemeral ones like paper, dust, flowers and feathers. Her sculptures are abstract and tend towards the biomorphic, appealing to organic forms like pods, shells, husks and seeds. Relics in the Pillow of Dreams (1985) is exemplary of this aesthetic. The organic nature of Ryan's work is accentuated by its direct placement on the floor, without a plinth.

Key is also the relationship between the container and the content, and therefore between the interior and exterior dimension. In an article published to coincide with her exhibition at Camden Arts Centre and Angel Row Gallery, Ryan explains how her small studio in New York is also a representation of the container, and as such a sculptural environment in which daily accumulations, dust heaps, deposits become the preoccupations in the work. Conceptually, Ryan draws on a combination of personal experience, ancestral history and the natural environment. A product of the British Caribbean diaspora, she is particularly attentive to questions of origins, memory, and belonging in relation to place and landscape. Domesticity, maternity and the role of women in society are also interrogated in her sculptures.

On 1 October 2021, Ryan's three-piece, marble and bronze work Custard Apple (Annonaceae), Breadfruit (Moraceae) and Soursop (Annonaceae), depicting three Caribbean fruits, was unveiled in the London Borough of Hackney as London's first permanent public monument celebrating the Windrush generation, and the first permanent public sculpture by a black female artist in the UK. The triptych received the 2022 Marsh Award for Excellence in Public Sculpture.

Exhibitions and residencies 
Solo exhibitions include Virginia Woolf: Exhibition Inspired By Her Writings at Tate St Ives and touring (2018); The Sculpture Collections Exhibition, Leeds Gallery Henry Moore Institute (2018); The Art House Wakefield (2017/18); The Weather Inside at The Mattress Factory, Pittsburgh PA (2011/12); Archaeology of the Black Sun. Musings After Kristeva at Salena Gallery, Long Island University, New York (2005). Previously, Ryan had solo shows at Camden Arts Centre, London and Angel Row, Nottingham (1995); Kettle's Yard, Cambridge, and Riverside Studios, London (1988); ICA, London (1987); Arnolfini Gallery, Bristol (1987). Her first solo show was at Tom Allen Centre (1984).

Ryan participated in numerous group exhibitions. In 2017, she was included in The Place Is Here at Nottingham Contemporary, Nottingham. In 2015, she was represented in the Arts Council Collection touring show Making It: Sculpture in Britain 1977–1986. Ryan was included in the touring show Recent British Sculpture, organised by the Arts Council in 1993–94. In 1990, her work was featured in the British Art Show at the Hayward Gallery, London. In 1986, she showed at Stoke City Garden Festival in Stoke-on-Trent, as well as being part of the exhibition From Two Worlds at Whitechapel Gallery in London and Fruitmarket Gallery in Edinburgh. In 1985, her work was included in The Thin Black Line, a groundbreaking exhibition curated by Lubaina Himid at the ICA, London. In 1983, Ryan was in Five Black Women Artists, also curated by Himid, this time at the Africa Centre, London. The following year, she took part in Sculptors and Modellers at Tate.

Ryan was in residence at Tate St Ives in 1998 and 2000–01, when she worked in the former studio of Barbara Hepworth and used marble gifted by the Hepworth Estate. In June 2017, she had a residency at The Art House, Wakefield, where she re-examined her connection with Barbara Hepworth in relation to themes of ancestral history, domesticity and memory.

Collections 
Ryan's work is in the permanent collections of the Pérez Art Museum Miami, Florida; Arts Council of Great Britain, Tate, and The Henry Moore Collection. Examples of her sculptures are also held with Firstsite, Colchester; Mellon Bank, Pittsburgh; Rochdale Art Gallery; Contemporary Arts Society; Weltkunst Foundation, London; Salsbury Collection; Irvin Joffe Collection, London; Cleveland County Museum; The Boise Scholarship Collection.

Honours and recognition 
In 2019, Ryan was awarded a Pollock Krasner Grant. In 2018, she was the recipient of a Freelands Award from the Freelands Foundation for an exhibition at Spike Island in the Autumn of 2020. Previously, she received the Henry Moore Foundation Award (1987). In 1983, Ryan was the winner of the second prize at the Cleveland International Drawing Biennale. A portrait of Ryan by photographer Andy Feldman is in the collection of the National Portrait Gallery, London

Ryan was appointed Officer of the Order of the British Empire (OBE) in the 2021 Birthday Honours for services to art. In 2022 Ryan won the Turner Prize.

References

Further reading 
Eddie Chambers, Black Artists in British Art: A History Since the 1950s (London; New York: I.B. Tauris, 2014).
Lubaina Himid, The Thin Black Line (London: ICA, 1985).
Veronica Ryan, Veronica Ryan: Compartments/ Apart-ments (London: Camden Arts Centre, 1995). 

1956 births
20th-century British women artists
21st-century British women artists
Alumni of Bath School of Art and Design
Alumni of the Slade School of Fine Art
Alumni of SOAS University of London
Black British artists
British contemporary artists
Living people
Montserratian artists
Montserratian emigrants to the United Kingdom
Officers of the Order of the British Empire